Baruch ben Isaac, called usually from Worms or from France (Tzarfat) was born approx. in 1140 and deceased in 1212 in Eretz Israel where he went in 1208 together with his friend Samson ben Abraham of Sens. He is not to be identified with another Baruch ben Isaac (fl. 1200), a Tosafist and codifier who was born at Worms, but lived at Regensburg, (he is sometimes called after the one and sometimes after the other city).

A pupil of the great Tosafist Isaac ben Samuel of Dampierre, Baruch wrote Tosafot to several treatises (e.g., Nashim, Nazir, Shabbat, Hullin); nearly all those extant on the tractate Zevahim are his. A. Epstein believes that the commentary on the Sifra contained in the Munich MS. No. 59 is the work of this Baruch. He is the author also of the legal compendium, Sefer ha-Terumah (Book of the Heave-Offering, Venice, 1523; Zolkiev, 1811), written circa 1202, containing the ordinances concerning slaughtering, permitted and forbidden food, the Sabbath, tefillin, etc. The book is one of the most important German codes, and was highly valued by contemporaries and successors. It is noteworthy by reason of the author's attempt to facilitate its use by presenting a synopsis of its contents, the first attempt at making a practical ritual codex in Germany.

References

Jewish Encyclopedia Bibliography 
 Azulai, Shem ha-Gedolim, i. 38, ed. Wilna;
 Kohn, Mardochai ben Hillel, p. 102;
 Michael, Or ha-Ḥayyim, No. 627;
 Epstein, in Monatsschrift, xxxix. 454;
 Leopold Zunz, Z. G. p. 36.

German Tosafists
Rabbis from Worms, Germany
Clergy from Regensburg
German Orthodox rabbis
13th-century German rabbis
Authors of books on Jewish law